William Graham (3 October 1914 – September 1996) was an English professional footballer who played as an inside forward.

Graham started his career in non-league football with Blyth Spartans before joining Football League Second Division club Burnley in September 1932. He made his debut for the club on 2 December 1933 in the 0–0 draw away at Millwall but did not appear again that season. Graham scored on his next outing for Burnley in the 3–3 draw with Bury on 27 October 1934. He scored again in the 1–3 defeat to Hull City on 19 March 1935 and played his final Burnley game on 13 April 1935 in the 1–2 loss against Bradford Park Avenue. Graham left Burnley at the end of the 1934–35 season and subsequently signed for Bury.
For Bury he made 81 Football League appearances and scored 29 goals. He also played 4 F.A.Cup ties, scoring one goal. He later played for Norwich City.

References

Bury F.C. - The Official History, by Peter Cullen (Yore Publications)

Football League Players Records, 1888–1939 (Michael Joyce).

Category: Norwich City F.C. players

1914 births
1996 deaths
People from Hetton-le-Hole
Footballers from Tyne and Wear
English footballers
Association football forwards
Blyth Spartans A.F.C. players
Burnley F.C. players
Bury F.C. players
English Football League players
Norwich City F.C. players